This is a compendium of poisonous fungi. See also mushroom poisoning.

List of toxic mushroom species
There are  poisonous fungus species listed below.

List of suspicious mushroom species

See also
List of deadly fungi
List of poisonous animals
List of poisonous plants
Mushroom poisoning
Mycotoxicology
Mycotoxin

References

External links

 
poisonous fungi, List of